Anti Selart (born 11 August 1973 in Tallinn) is an Estonian historian and philosopher.

Selart is professor of middle ages in University of Tartu (since 2009). He studies history of medieval Livonia, especially Russo-Livonian relationships.
In 2002 he got PhD in history.

Publications 
  Livland Und Die Rus Im 13. Jahrhundert in Series: "Quellen Und Studien Zur Baltischen Geschichte (Book 21)" 373 pages Bohlau Verlag (March 3, 2007) 
  Die livländische Chronik des Hermann von Wartberge, in: Matthias Thumser (Hg.), Geschichtsschreibung im mittelalterlichen Livland, Berlin 2011, S. 59–86.  (Rezension).

References

External links
 CV on the page of University of Tartu (in Estonian)
 academia.edu profile
 Anti Selart on page of Estonian Research Portal (in English)

1973 births
Living people
Historians of Estonia
20th-century Estonian historians
Estonian philosophers
University of Tartu alumni
Academic staff of the University of Tartu
People from Tallinn